Steamer Pravda was a Soviet merchant freighter of about 3,100 tonnes displacement, which was active in the Soviet Arctic during the 1930s. This ship had been normally used for carrying timber. It was named after Soviet newspaper Pravda. 

In 1933, the newly formed Chief Directorate of the Northern Sea Route sent Pravda, under Captain Kh. A. Belitskiy, to Nordvik on the first oil exploration expedition to Northern Siberia. This venture was led by N.N. Urvantsev who travelled on Pravda along with his wife, Dr. Yelizaveta Ivanovna who was in charge of medical care. Pravdas cargo consisted of 2,430 tonnes of equipment and supplies for this important expedition, including four experimental NATI-2 half-track vehicles built by the Nauchnyy Avtotraktornyy Institut in Moscow. These were the first tracked vehicles to be used in the Russian Arctic. They would be used to haul the drill, buildings and supplies, from the landing site to the drilling site. Apart from the detachable drill rig and a fully equipped drilling camp, Pravda also carried the rails, ties and rolling stock for a narrow-gauge railway.

Pravda travelled along with steamers Tovarich Stalin  and Volodarskiy, which were on their way to the mouth of the Lena. 

By 4 September Pravda was in the Khatanga Gulf, close to Nordvik. Captain Belitskiy had decided to approach Nordvik Bay from the east, between Poluostrov Paksa and Bolshoy Begichev Island. Despite having no knowledge of the depths in the channel Belitskiy went ahead, without taking the elementary precaution of sounding and Pravda ran aground in the centre of the channel two times. 

Ice conditions in the Vilkitsky Strait (between Severnaya Zemlya and Cape Chelyuskin), forced the three freighters of the convoy to winter at Ostrov Samuila in the Komsomolskaya Pravda Islands. A shore station was built and a full scientific programme maintained all winter by Urvantsev and Ivanovna.

These ships were released in the following year by icebreaker Feodor Litke. Feodor Litke made such a great effort to break a channel through the thick ice that it caused damage to its hull.

Once freed, Pravda proceeded to Maria Pronchishcheva Bay to retrieve the fuel and boats she had had to jettison there, after which she sailed to Nordvik Bay, her initial destination.

See also
Nordvik (Laptev Sea)

References
 

Ships of the Soviet Union
Laptev Sea
Polar exploration by Russia and the Soviet Union
Arctic exploration vessels